This is a list of flag bearers who have represented Jordan at the Olympics.

Flag bearers carry the national flag of their country at the opening ceremony of the Olympic Games.

See also

Jordan at the Olympics

References

Jordan at the Olympics
Jordan
Olympic flagbearers
Olympic flagbearers